Paul Lawrence Rose (26 February 1944 – December 2014) was the Professor of European History and Mitrani Professor of Jewish Studies at Pennsylvania State University. Rose specialized in the study of anti-Semitism, Germany history, European intellectual history, and Jewish history.

Bibliography

Revolutionary Antisemitism in Germany: From Kant to Wagner (Orinceton: Princeton University Press, 1990) ISBN 0-691-0314-4

Notes

2014 deaths
American historians
1944 births